is a city located in Okayama Prefecture, Japan. The city was founded on May 1, 1954. As of March 31, 2017, the city has an estimated population of 31,556, with 14,519 households and a population density of 58 persons per km². The total area is 547.01 km².

Bitchū Matsuyama Castle overlooks the town. Another significant location is Raikyū-ji, a Buddhist temple with an historic garden.

On October 1, 2004, Takahashi absorbed the town of Ukan (from Jōbō District), and the towns of Nariwa, Kawakami and Bitchū (all from Kawakami District) to become the new and expanded city of Takahashi. Kawakami District was dissolved as a result of this merger.

Geography

Climate
Takahashi has a humid subtropical climate (Köppen climate classification Cfa).

Demographics
Per Japanese census data, the population of Takahashi in 2020 is 29,072 people. Takahashi has been conducting censuses since 1920.

Trivia
In 2014, the city of Takahashi sponsored production of an anime series, Ai Tenchi Muyo!, to promote tourism to the region.

References

External links

 
 Takahashi City official website 
 Discover Okayama of Japan

Cities in Okayama Prefecture